Ride with Me is the debut studio album by German recording artist Vanessa S. It was released by BMG on August 25, 2003, in German-speaking Europe, following her participation in the debut season of reality talent show Deutschland sucht den Superstar, where she had finished fourth. Incorporating elements of dance pop and contemporary R&B, Vanessa worked with several collaborators on the album, including Polish hip hop producer DJ Tomekk and his protégés Trooper Da Don and Said as well as rappers GERM and Ferris MC.

The album received lukewarm reviews from critics, with laut.de comparing its sound unfavorably to Jennifer Lopez's early albums while praising Vanessa's vocal performance. A moderate commercial success, Ride with Me debuted and peaked at number 30 on the German Albums Chart. Its release was preceded by the top five single "Ride Or Die (I Need You)" and followed by the top thirty entry "Fiesta" as well as the double-A single "Ey Ey Ey"/"Back to Life". However, lackluster sales in excess of 30,000 copies resulted into the termination of her recording contract with BMG in 2004, making Ride with Me her only album with the label.

Track listing

Charts

References

2003 debut albums